Albertaceratops (meaning "Alberta horned face") was a genus of centrosaurine horned dinosaur from the middle Campanian-age Upper Cretaceous Oldman Formation of Alberta, Canada.

Description
 

Albertaceratops is unusual in combining long brow horns with an otherwise centrosaurine skull, as centrosaurines normally possess short brow horns. Over its nose was a bony ridge, and on its frill were two large outwardly-projecting hooks.

Discovery and naming

Albertaceratops is known from a single complete skull (TMP.2001.26.1) found in August 2001 and skull and postcranial fragments. A phylogenetic analysis carried out by its describer, Michael J. Ryan, found it to be the most basal centrosaurine. Additional specimens were reported from a bonebed in the Judith River Formation of Montana, which is equivalent to the Oldman Formation and differentiated only by the Canada–US border. However, further study showed these remains to come from a different centrosaurine, Medusaceratops. Both ceratopsids lived during the same time period, about 77.5 million years ago.

The specific name, A. nesmoi, is derived from the name of Cecil Nesmo, a rancher living in Manyberries, Alberta, a town of less than 100 people located 71 km south of Medicine Hat. The rancher was thus honored in recognition of his efforts to aid fossil hunters.

Classification
 

The cladogram presented below follows a phylogenetic analysis by Chiba et al. (2017), which included a systematic re-evaluation of Medusaceratops lokii:

See also

 Timeline of ceratopsian research

References

External links

Drawing of the skull, by Julius T. Csotonyi

An article about Cecil Nesmo from the Calgary Sun

Fossils of Canada
Centrosaurines
Late Cretaceous dinosaurs of North America
Fossil taxa described in 2007
Oldman fauna
Paleontology in Alberta
Campanian genus first appearances
Campanian genus extinctions
Ornithischian genera